James Walker of Richmondhill (1837–c.1910) was a Scottish businessman who served as Lord Provost of Aberdeen.

Life
He was born at Tomachallich a hill farm in the parish of Aboyne on 28 August 1837.

He entered Aberdeen town Council in 1870. He was elected Lord Provost in 1902 and at that time was living at 87 Crown Street in Aberdeen. He was succeeded by Sir Alexander Lyon in 1905.

He died at Richmondhill House on 13 July 1921.

Artistic recognition

He was portrayed by Sir George Reid in 1907, his council colleagues presenting him with the picture as a mark of their respect.

References
 

1837 births

Lord Provosts of Aberdeen
1921 deaths